Kyrgyz International Airlines was an airline based in Kyrgyzstan.

Fleet 
Kyrgyz International Airlines operated the following aircraft (as of July 2021):

References

Defunct airlines of Kyrgyzstan